1933 World Table Tennis Championships may refer to:

 1933 World Table Tennis Championships (January), held in Baden bei Wien
 1933 World Table Tennis Championships (December), held in London